Michael Hutchison may refer to:
 Michael Hutchison (politician), Scottish politician
 Michael Hutchison (priest), Scottish priest
 Michael Hutchison (judge), British lawyer and judge

See also
 Michael Hutchinson (disambiguation)